Choriolysin L (teleost hatching enzyme (component), low choriolytic enzyme (LCE)) is an enzyme. This enzyme catalyses the following chemical reaction

 Hydrolysis of the inner layer of fish egg envelope. Also hydrolysis of casein and small molecule substrates such as succinyl-Leu-Leu-Val-Tyr-7-(4-methyl)coumarylamide

This enzyme is present in teleost fish Oryzias latipes.

References

External links 
 

EC 3.4.24